"Sugar Box" is a song by British band Then Jerico, released as the third single from their 1989 album The Big Area. The song peaked at No. 22 on the UK Singles Chart in August 1989. It is the band's third biggest hit, after "Big Area" (No. 13) and their 1987 song "The Motive (Living Without You)" (No. 18).

References

1989 singles
Then Jerico songs
1989 songs
Song recordings produced by Rick Nowels
London Records singles